Jim McKendrick also known as James Alexander McKendrick (27 July 1870 – 1 January 1895) was a South African international rugby union player who played as a forward. 

He made his only international appearance for South Africa in their Test—against Great Britain.

References

1870 births
1895 deaths
South African rugby union players
South Africa international rugby union players
People from Stellenbosch
Western Province (rugby union) players
Alumni of Paul Roos Gymnasium
Rugby union forwards
Rugby union players from the Western Cape